Samajik Ekta Party (Social United Party), a political party in Haryana, India. The party's president is Nafe Singh Dahiya. Ahead of the 1999 state assembly elections, SEP had joined the Haryana Sarvjatiya Morcha (Haryana All Caste Front). It is a state level party and fight elections within Haryana state.

References

Political parties in Haryana
Political parties with year of establishment missing